Thomas Atkins Wardell (ca. 1865–1902) was an Ontario lawyer and political figure. He represented Wentworth North in the Legislative Assembly of Ontario from 1898 to 1902 as a Conservative member.

He was born in Dundas, Ontario, the son of Alex Richard Wardell, and entered practice with his father. Wardell was mayor of Dundas in 1896.

External links 

Crombie family archives:McMaster University Libraries
Picturesque Dundas, 1972, O. Newcombe

1865 births
1902 deaths
Mayors of places in Ontario
People from Dundas, Ontario
Progressive Conservative Party of Ontario MPPs